Drzewica is a town in Łódź Voivodeship (central Poland).

Drzewica may also refer to:

Drzewica, Lubusz Voivodeship (west Poland)
Drzewica, West Pomeranian Voivodeship (north-west Poland)